A tureen is a serving dish for foods such as soups or stews.

Tureen may also refer to:

 Tom Tureen (born 1945), American lawyer

See also
 Tureen VII, one of the fictional planets and moons in Star Wars
 Turenne, Corrèze, a commune in central France